Lempia is a village near Ziro in Lower Subansiri district of Arunachal Pradesh

References

Villages in Lower Subansiri district